Fort Blackmore is an unincorporated community in Scott County, Virginia, United States. Fort Blackmore has a post office with ZIP code 24250.

Notable people
John King, stock car racing driver

References

Unincorporated communities in Scott County, Virginia
Unincorporated communities in Virginia